Riyadh Al-Arini (Arabic:رياض العريني; born 11 August 1989) is a Saudi football (soccer) player who plays as a midfielder. He played in the Pro League for Al-Hazm.

External links
 

Saudi Arabian footballers
Al Jeel Club players
Al-Kholood Club players
Al-Hazem F.C. players
Al Batin FC players
1989 births
Living people
Saudi First Division League players
Saudi Professional League players
Saudi Fourth Division players
Association football midfielders